This is a list of airports in Mauritania, sorted by location.



Airports 

Airport names shown in bold indicate the airport has scheduled service on commercial airlines.

See also 
 Transport in Mauritania
 List of airports by ICAO code: G#GQ - Mauritania
 Wikipedia: WikiProject Aviation/Airline destination lists: Africa#Mauritania

References 
 
  - includes IATA codes
 Great Circle Mapper: Airports in Mauritania - IATA and ICAO codes
 World Aero Data: Airports in Mauritania - ICAO codes
 Aircraft Charter World: Airports in Mauritania

Mauritania
 
Airports
Airports
Mauritania